Return to the Sea may refer to:

 Return to the Sea, a 2006 album by Islands
 Return to the Sea (TV series), an American television series that aired from 1991 to 1992 and in 1995
 The Little Mermaid II: Return to the Sea, a 2000 film